The year 1959 in film involved some significant events, with Ben-Hur winning a record 11 Academy Awards.

Top-grossing films (U.S.)

The top ten 1959 released films by box office gross in North America are as follows:

Events
 January 23 – Republic Pictures releases its last production, Plunderers of Painted Flats.
January 29 – Walt Disney's Sleeping Beauty premieres, their most expensive film to date and the first animated film to be shot in Super Technirama 70. It initially ends up losing money for the studio due to its high production costs. However, it would eventually gain a cult following and is now considered one of Disney's great classics.
April 30 – François Truffaut's The 400 Blows opens the 1959 Cannes Film Festival bringing international attention to the French New Wave.
 June 4 – The Three Stooges release their 190th and last short film, Sappy Bull Fighters.
 June 7 –  A contract between Paramount and Jerry Lewis Productions is signed specifying a payment of $10 million plus 60% of the profits for 14 films over a seven-year period. This contract made Lewis the highest paid individual Hollywood talent to date and was unprecedented in that he had unlimited creative control, including final cut, and the return of film rights after 30 years. 
 July 1 - Herbert J. Yates, founder of Republic Pictures, sells his controlling stake in the company.
 July – Les Cousins, another film of the French New Wave, wins the Golden Bear at the 9th Berlin International Film Festival.
 July 22 – Joseph E. Levine promotes the release of Hercules in the United States starring Steve Reeves which popularizes the sword and sandals genre.
 August 4 – The Big Fisherman is the first film released in Super Panavision 70.
 September 30 – The film of Mise Éire, made by George Morrison for Gael Linn, is premiered to close the Cork Film Festival, the first feature-length Irish language film.
 October 7 – Rock Hudson, who is later voted top in the Top Ten Money Making Stars Poll for the year, appears in Pillow Talk alongside Doris Day for the first time.
 October 14 – Legendary Australian-born actor Errol Flynn dies of a heart attack in Vancouver, Canada at the age of 50.
 November 18 – William Wyler's Ben-Hur, the most expensive film of all time with a budget of $15,175,000, premieres at Loew's State Theater in New York City.  It went on to win a record 11 Academy Awards.
 December 2 – The battle of the smellies starts with the release of the documentary Behind the Great Wall in AromaRama, with scents pumped into the theater during the film.

Awards 

Palme d'Or (Cannes Film Festival):
Black Orpheus (Orfeu Negro), directed by Marcel Camus, France

Golden Lion (Venice Film Festival):
Il Generale della Rovere (General della Rovere), directed by Roberto Rossellini, Italy / France
La grande guerra (The Great War), directed by Mario Monicelli, Italy / France

Golden Bear (Berlin Film Festival):
Les Cousins (The Cousins), directed by Claude Chabrol, France

1959 film releases
United States unless stated

January–March
January 1959
2 January
Kaagaz Ke Phool (India)
6 January
The Captain's Table
13 January
Guns, Girls and Gangsters
16 January
Anari (India)
22 January
Room at the Top (Britain)
The Tiger of Eschnapur (West Germany)
25 January
The Law (Italy)
28 January
The Trap
29 January
Sleeping Beauty
February 1959
11 February
The Hanging Tree
12 February
The Black Orchid
15 February
No Name on the Bullet
Ride Lonesome
17 February
House on Haunted Hill
19 February
The Journey
22 February
Model for Murder
24 February
Make Mine a Million (Britain)
26 February
City of Fear
March 1959
3 March
The Giant Behemoth
A Stranger in My Arms
4 March
Up Periscope
5 March
Carry On Nurse (Britain)
6 March
Breakout
8 March
Too Many Crooks (Britain)
10 March
Carlton-Browne of the F.O. (Britain)
11 March
Les Cousins (France)
12 March
The 39 Steps
18 March
The Diary of Anne Frank
The Sad Horse
19 March
Green Mansions
The Shaggy Dog
20 March
Alias Jesse James
25 March
Al Capone
Tiger Bay (Britain)
29 March
Honeymoon (Britain/Spain)
Some Like It Hot

April–June
April 1959
1 April
Compulsion
Warlock
4 April
Rio Bravo
6 April
The Sound and the Fury
8 April
Thunder in the Sun
10 April
Gidget
14 April
The Fugitive Kind
16 April
Court Martial (West Germany)
21 April
Sapphire (Britain)
23 April
Count Your Blessings
The World, the Flesh and the Devil
25 April
A Home for Tanya (USSR)
Westbound
29 April
The Mating Game
30 April
Imitation of Life
May 1959
1 May
The World of Apu (India)
2 May
The Sign of Leo (France)
4 May
The 400 Blows (France)
The Hound of the Baskervilles (Britain)
8 May
These Thousand Hills
9 May
There Will Be No Leave Today (USSR)
12 May
Face of a Fugitive
Good Morning (Japan)
14 May
Serious Charge (Britain)
19 May
The Young Philadelphians
21 May
Ask Any Girl
Shake Hands with the Devil (U.S./Ireland)
23 May
Little Greaser
27 May
The Wild and the Innocent
Woman Obsessed
29 May
The Man in the Net
Pork Chop Hill
June 1959
4 June
Nazarín (Mexico)
10 June
Hiroshima Mon Amour (France/Japan)
12 June
Black Orpheus (Brazil/France/Italy)
The Horse Soldiers
16 June
Don't Give Up The Ship
John Paul Jones
Ten Seconds to Hell
17 June
The Hangman
Middle of the Night
18 June
The Five Pennies
Say One for Me
Teenagers from Outer Space
This Happy Feeling
24 June
Porgy and Bess
25 June
The Giant Gila Monster
The Killer Shrews
26 June
Darby O'Gill and the Little People (With Donald in Mathmagic Land released with it)
This Earth Is Mine
27 June
Letter Never Sent  (USSR)

July–September
July 1959
1 July
North by Northwest
2 July
Anatomy of a Murder
3 July
The Beat Generation
The Heart of a Man
Return of the Fly
5 July
The Big Circus
8 July
Tarzan's Greatest Adventure
11 July
Yesterday's Enemy
14 July
The Legend of Tom Dooley
15 July
A Hole in the Head
16 July
The Alligator People
17 July
The Mouse That Roared (Britain)
18 July
The Nun's Story
20 July
Day of the Outlaw
22 July
Plan 9 from Outer Space
24 July
Holiday for Lovers
29 July
The Angry Hills
Last Train from Gun Hill
The Tingler
30 July
Blue Denim
August 1959
4 August
The Big Fisherman
5 August
It Happened to Jane
6 August
The 30 Foot Bride of Candy Rock
The Scapegoat (Britain)
9 August
The Bat
11 August
The Big Operator
13 August
I'm All Right Jack (Britain)
19 August
But Not for Me
It Started with a Kiss
20 August
The Devil's Disciple (U.S./Britain)
22 August
Fate of a Man (USSR)
24 August
Sampo (U.S.S.R./Finland)
September 1959
3 September
Carry On Teacher (Britain)
4 September
The Blue Angel
9 September
Les liaisons dangereuses (France)
10 September
The Great St. Louis Bank Robbery
11 September
That Kind of Woman
12 September
Battle Beyond the Sun (USSR)
15 September
Look Back in Anger (Britain)
16 September
Jet Storm (Britain)
18 September
Dil Deke Dekho (India)
24 September
Killers of Kilimanjaro
25 September
The Great War (Italy)
The Mummy (Britain)
26 September
General Della Rovere (Italy)

October–December
October 1959
3 October
A Bucket of Blood
Girls Town
6 October
Pillow Talk
7 October
4D Man
Career
North West Frontier
8 October
The Nightingale's Prayer (Egypt)
9 October
The Best of Everything
15 October
Odds Against Tomorrow
The Roots of Heaven
16 October
Two Men in Manhattan (France)
18 October
The Crimson Kimono
21 October
The FBI Story
They Came to Cordura
The Wonderful Country
22 October
The Bridge (West Germany)
The Last Angry Man
23 October
Libel (Britain)
25 October
The Three Treasures (Japan)
27 October
Solomon and Sheba
30 October
Paigham (India)
The Wasp Woman
November 1959
2 November
Edge of Eternity
3 November
Fires on the Plain (Japan)
4 November
Jet Over the Atlantic
6 November
The Wreck of the Mary Deare (U.S./Britain)
10 November
Happy Anniversary
Third Man on the Mountain
11 November
The Facts of Murder (Italy)
Shadows
Yellowstone Kelly
12 November
The Miracle
The Soldiers of Pancho Villa (Mexico)
13 November
Estate Violenta (Italy/France)
14 November
Bad Girls Don't Cry (Italy)
Insan Jaag Utha (India)
17 November
Beloved Infidel
18 November
Ben-Hur
A Summer Place
22 November
Timbuktu
23 November
The Angry Red Planet
29 November
The Atomic Submarine
30 November
The Man Who Could Cheat Death (Britain)
December 1959
1 December
1001 Arabian Nights
Ballad of a Soldier (USSR)
The Rookie
5 December
Republic of Sin (France/Mexico)
Operation Petticoat
7 December
Never So Few
11 December
Expresso Bongo (Britain)
Li'l Abner
SOS Pacific (Britain)
12 December
Hannibal (Italy)
Terror Is a Man (U.S./Philippines)
15 December
Follow a Star (Britain)
16 December
Blessings of the Land (Philippines)
The Gazebo
Journey to the Center of the Earth
Pickpocket (France)
The Shakedown
17 December
On the Beach
18 December
We are Altogether Crazy (Denmark)
20 December
A Dog's Best Friend
Suddenly, Last Summer
21 December
Tommy the Toreador (Britain)
25 December
Magic Boy (Japan)
26 December
Battle in Outer Space (Japan)
28 December
Come Dance with Me (France/Italy)
30 December
Our Man in Havana (Britain)
31 December
The Adventures of Buratino (USSR)

Notable films released in 1959
United States unless stated

#
4D Man, starring Robert Lansing and Lee Meriwether
The 30 Foot Bride of Candy Rock, starring Lou Costello and Dorothy Provine
The 39 Steps, starring Kenneth More – (Britain)
The 400 Blows (Les Quatre Cents Coups), directed by François Truffaut, starring Jean-Pierre Léaud – (France)Nights
1001 Arabian Nights, animated film  directed by Jack Kinney.

A
The Adventures of Buratino (Priklyucheniya Buratino) – (USSR)
Al Capone, starring Rod Steiger
Alias Jesse James, starring Bob Hope
The Alligator People, starring Beverly Garland
Anari, starring Raj Kapoor – (India)
Anatomy of a Murder, directed by Otto Preminger, starring James Stewart, Lee Remick, Ben Gazzara, Eve Arden, Arthur O'Connell, Kathryn Grant, George C. Scott
The Angry Hills, starring Robert Mitchum and Gia Scala
The Angry Red Planet (aka Invasion of Mars), starring Gerald Mohr
Argument About Basia (Awantura o Basię) – (Poland)

B
Bad Girls Don't Cry (La notte brava), starring Rosanna Schiaffino – (Italy)
Ballad of a Soldier (Ballada o soldate), directed by Grigory Chukhray – (U.S.S.R.)
The Bat, starring Vincent Price and Agnes Moorehead
Battle Beyond the Sun – (U.S.S.R.)
Battle in Outer Space, directed by Ishirō Honda – (Japan)
The Battle of the Sexes, starring Peter Sellers – (Britain)
The Beat Generation, starring Steve Cochran and Mamie Van Doren
Beloved Infidel, starring Gregory Peck and Deborah Kerr
Ben-Hur, directed by William Wyler, starring Charlton Heston, Stephen Boyd, Jack Hawkins – winner of 11 Academy Awards and 4 Golden Globes
The Best of Everything, starring Hope Lange, Diane Baker, Suzy Parker, Stephen Boyd, Joan Crawford
The Big Circus, starring Victor Mature, Rhonda Fleming, Red Buttons, Gilbert Roland, Kathryn Grant
The Big Fisherman, starring Howard Keel
The Big Operator, starring Mickey Rooney, Steve Cochran, Mamie Van Doren
The Birth of Japan (Nippon Tanjō), starring Toshiro Mifune – (Japan)
Black Orpheus, directed by Marcel Camus – winner of Palme d'Or, Golden Globe, Oscar and Bafta – (Brazil/France/Italy)
Blessings of the Land (Biyaya ng lupa), starring Rosa Rosal – (Philippines)
Breakout, starring Hazel Court
The Bridge (Die Brücke), directed by Bernhard Wicki – (West Germany)
A Bucket of Blood, directed by Roger Corman
But Not for Me, directed by Walter Lang, starring Clark Gable, Carroll Baker, Lee J. Cobb

C
The Captain's Table, starring John Gregson and Peggy Cummins – (Britain)
Career, starring Dean Martin, Shirley MacLaine, Anthony Franciosa
Carlton-Browne of the F.O., starring Peter Sellers, Terry-Thomas, John Le Mesurier – (Britain)
Carry On Nurse, starring Shirley Eaton and Kenneth Connor – (Britain)
Carry On Teacher, starring Kenneth Connor and Leslie Phillips – (Britain)
The Chasers (Jakten) – (Norway)
City of Fear, score by Jerry Goldsmith
Come Dance with Me, starring Brigitte Bardot – (France/Italy)
Compulsion, starring Orson Welles, Bradford Dillman, Dean Stockwell, Diane Varsi, E. G. Marshall
Court Martial (Kriegsgericht) – (West Germany)
Les Cousins, directed by Claude Chabrol – (France)
The Crimson Kimono, directed by Samuel Fuller, starring James Shigeta

D
Danger Within, starring Richard Todd, Bernard Lee, Richard Attenborough – (Britain)
Darby O'Gill and the Little People, starring Sean Connery
Date With Death, starring Gerald Mohr
Day of the Outlaw, starring Robert Ryan, Tina Louise, Burl Ives
The Death Ship (Das Totenschiff), starring Horst Buchholz – (West Germany)
Destiny of a Man (Sudba cheloveka), directed by Sergei Bondarchuk – (U.S.S.R.)
The Devil's Disciple, starring Laurence Olivier, Burt Lancaster, Kirk Douglas – (U.S./Britain)
The Diary of Anne Frank, directed by George Stevens, starring Millie Perkins, Joseph Schildkraut, Shelley Winters, Richard Beymer, Diane Baker, Ed Wynn
Dil Deke Dekho, starring Shammi Kapoor – (India)
Donald in Mathmagic Land (short subject)
Don't Give Up The Ship, starring Jerry Lewis
Dust on the Brain (Støv på hjernen) – (Norway)

E
Expresso Bongo, starring Laurence Harvey and Cliff Richard – (Britain)

F
The FBI Story, starring James Stewart
Face of a Fugitive, starring Fred MacMurray
The Facts of Murder (Un maledetto imbroglio), directed by and starring Pietro Germi with Claudia Cardinale – (Italy)
La fièvre monte à El Pao (Fever Mounts at El Pao), directed by Luis Buñuel – (France/Mexico)
Fires on the Plain (Nobi), directed by Kon Ichikawa – (Japan)
The Five Pennies, starring Danny Kaye
Floating Weeds (Ukikusa), directed by Yasujirō Ozu – (Japan)
Follow a Star, starring Norman Wisdom, Ron Moody, Hattie Jacques – (Britain)
Forbidden Women, directed by Mahmoud Zulfikar, starring Salah Zulfikar and Huda Sultan – (Egypt)
The Fugitive Kind, directed by Sidney Lumet, starring Marlon Brando, Anna Magnani, Joanne Woodward

G
The Gazebo, starring Glenn Ford, Debbie Reynolds, Carl Reiner
Il Generale della Rovere, directed by Roberto Rossellini, starring Vittorio De Sica – (Italy)
The Giant Behemoth, starring Gene Evans and André Morell
Gidget, starring Sandra Dee
Girls Town, starring Mamie Van Doren
Good Morning (Ohayō), directed by Yasujirō Ozu – (Japan)
La grande guerra (The Great War), directed by Mario Monicelli, starring Alberto Sordi and Vittorio Gassman – (Italy)
The Gunfight at Dodge City, starring Joel McCrea
Guns, Girls and Gangsters, directed by Edward L. Cahn

H
The Hanging Tree, directed by Delmer Daves, starring Gary Cooper, Karl Malden, George C. Scott
The Hangman, starring Robert Taylor and Tina Louise
Hannibal, starring Victor Mature and Rita Gam
Happy Anniversary, starring David Niven and Mitzi Gaynor
The Heart of a Man, starring Frankie Vaughan and Anne Heywood – (Britain)
Hiroshima Mon Amour, directed by Alain Resnais – (France/Japan)
A Hole in the Head, starring Frank Sinatra, Edward G. Robinson, Carolyn Jones, Eddie Hodges
Holiday for Lovers, starring Jane Wyman, Clifton Webb, Jill St. John
A Home for Tanya (Otchiy dom) – (USSR)
Honeymoon (Luna de miel), directed by Michael Powell – (Britain/Spain)
The Horse Soldiers, starring John Wayne, William Holden, Constance Towers
The Hound of the Baskervilles (British), a Sherlock Holmes mystery directed by Terence Fisher for Hammer Films, starring Peter Cushing as Holmes, Andre Morell as Watson and Christopher Lee as Sir Henry Baskerville – (Britain)
House on Haunted Hill, starring Vincent Price

I
I'm All Right Jack, directed by the Boulting Brothers, starring Peter Sellers and Ian Carmichael – (Britain)
Imitation of Life, directed by Douglas Sirk, starring Lana Turner, John Gavin, Sandra Dee, Susan Kohner, Juanita Moore
The Immoral Mr. Teas, directed by Russ Meyer
The Indian Tomb, directed by Fritz Lang – (West Germany)
Insan Jaag Utha, starring Madhubala – (India)
It Happened to Jane, starring Doris Day, Jack Lemmon, Ernie Kovacs
It Started with a Kiss, starring Debbie Reynolds and Glenn Ford

J
The Jazz Singer, a television film starring Jerry Lewis
Jet Over the Atlantic, starring Guy Madison and Virginia Mayo
Jet Storm, starring Richard Attenborough, Stanley Baker, Diane Cilento, Mai Zetterling – (Britain)
John Paul Jones, starring Robert Stack
The Journey, starring Yul Brynner and Deborah Kerr
Journey to the Center of the Earth, starring James Mason and Pat Boone

K
Kaagaz Ke Phool (Paper Flowers), directed by and starring Guru Dutt – (India)
Kapò, directed by Gillo Pontecorvo, starring Susan Strasberg – (Italy/France/Yugoslavia)
Killers of Kilimanjaro, starring Robert Taylor, Anthony Newley, Anne Aubrey

L
The Last Angry Man, starring Paul Muni
Last Train from Gun Hill, starring Kirk Douglas, Anthony Quinn, Carolyn Jones, Earl Holliman
The Law (La Legge), starring Gina Lollobrigida and Yves Montand – (Italy)
El Lazarillo de Tormes, winner of Golden Bear – (Spain)
Le signe du lion, directed by Éric Rohmer – (France)
The Legend of Tom Dooley, starring Michael Landon
Les liaisons dangereuses, directed by Roger Vadim, starring Jeanne Moreau – (France)
Letter Never Sent (Neotpravlennoye pismo) – (USSR)
Little Greaser
Libel, directed by Anthony Asquith, starring Dirk Bogarde and Olivia de Havilland – (Britain)
Li'l Abner, directed by Melvin Frank, starring Peter Palmer, Leslie Parrish, Stella Stevens, Julie Newmar, Stubby Kaye
Look Back in Anger, directed by Tony Richardson, starring Richard Burton and Claire Bloom – (Britain)

M
Magic Boy (Shōnen Sarutobi Sasuke) – Japanese animated film
Maigret et l'affaire Saint-Fiacre, directed by Jean Delannoy, starring Jean Gabin – (France)
Make Mine a Million, directed by Lance Comfort and starring Arthur Askey and Sid James – (Britain)
The Man in the Net, directed by Michael Curtiz, starring Alan Ladd and Carolyn Jones
The Man Who Could Cheat Death, starring Anton Diffring and Hazel Court
Model for Murder, starring Keith Andes and Hazel Court
The Master and His Servants (Herren og hans tjenere) – (Norway)
A Midsummer Night's Dream (Sen noci svatojánské), an animated puppet film by Jiří Trnka – (Czechoslovakia)
The Miracle, starring Carroll Baker and Roger Moore
Mise Éire – (Ireland)
The Mouse That Roared, starring Peter Sellers and Jean Seberg – (Britain)
The Mummy, starring Peter Cushing and Christopher Lee – (Britain)
My Second Brother, directed by Shōhei Imamura – (Japan)

N
Nazarín, directed by Luis Buñuel – (Mexico)
Never So Few, starring Frank Sinatra, Gina Lollobrigida, Peter Lawford, Steve McQueen
Night Train (Pociąg) – (Poland)
The Nightingale's Prayer (Doaa al-Karawan) – (Egypt)
No Name on the Bullet, starring Audie Murphy
North by Northwest, directed by Alfred Hitchcock, starring Cary Grant, Eva Marie Saint, James Mason
North West Frontier, aka Flame Over India, starring Kenneth More and Lauren Bacall – (Britain)
The Nun's Story, directed by Fred Zinnemann, starring Audrey Hepburn

O
Odd Obsession (Kagi), directed by Kon Ichikawa – (Japan)
Odds Against Tomorrow, starring Harry Belafonte and Robert Ryan
On the Beach, directed by Stanley Kramer, starring Gregory Peck, Ava Gardner, Fred Astaire, Anthony Perkins
Operation Petticoat, starring Cary Grant and Tony Curtis
Our Man in Havana, directed by Carol Reed, starring Alec Guinness, Maureen O'Hara, Noël Coward, Ernie Kovacs – (Britain)
The Overcoat (Shinel) – (USSR)

P
Paigham, directed by S. S. Vasan, starring Dilip Kumar, Vyjayanthimala, Raaj Kumar, B. Saroja Devi – (India)
Pickpocket, directed by Robert Bresson – (France)
Pillow Talk, starring Doris Day and Rock Hudson
El Pisito (The Little Apartment), directed by Marco Ferreri – (Spain)
Plan 9 from Outer Space, directed by Edward D. Wood, Jr., starring Tor Johnson, Vampira, Bela Lugosi
Porgy and Bess, a musical directed by Otto Preminger, starring Sidney Poitier and Dorothy Dandridge, music by George and Ira Gershwin
Pork Chop Hill, starring Gregory Peck

R
The Rest Is Silence (Der Rest ist Schweigen), starring Hardy Krüger – (West Germany)
Return of the Fly, starring Vincent Price
Ride Lonesome, starring Randolph Scott
Rio Bravo, directed by Howard Hawks, starring John Wayne, Dean Martin, Ricky Nelson, Walter Brennan, Angie Dickinson
The Rookie, starring Julie Newmar, Tommy Noonan, Peter Marshall
Room at the Top, directed by Jack Clayton, starring Simone Signoret and Laurence Harvey – (Britain)
The Roots of Heaven, directed by John Huston, starring Errol Flynn, Trevor Howard, Juliette Gréco, Eddie Albert, Orson Welles

S
Sampo (The Day the Earth Froze) – (U.S.S.R./Finland)
Sapphire, directed by Basil Dearden – (Britain)
Say One for Me, starring Bing Crosby, Debbie Reynolds and Robert Wagner
The Scapegoat, starring Alec Guinness and Bette Davis – (Britain)
Serious Charge, starring Anthony Quayle – (Britain)
Shadows, directed by John Cassavetes
The Shaggy Dog, starring Fred MacMurray, Jean Hagen and Tommy Kirk
The Shakedown, starring Donald Pleasence and Hazel Court
Shake Hands with the Devil, starring James Cagney – (U.S./Ireland)
Sleeping Beauty, animated film produced by Walt Disney
The Soldiers of Pancho Villa (La cucaracha), starring María Félix and Dolores del Río – (Mexico)
Solomon and Sheba, starring Yul Brynner and Gina Lollobrigida
Some Like It Hot, directed by Billy Wilder, starring Marilyn Monroe, Tony Curtis and Jack Lemmon
SOS Pacific, starring Richard Attenborough – (Britain)
The Sound and the Fury, starring Yul Brynner and Joanne Woodward
Stars (Sterne), directed by Konrad Wolf – (East Germany/Bulgaria)
A Stranger in My Arms, starring Jeff Chandler, June Allyson, Mary Astor and Sandra Dee
Suddenly, Last Summer, directed by Joseph L. Mankiewicz, starring Elizabeth Taylor, Montgomery Clift and Katharine Hepburn
A Summer Place, starring Troy Donahue and Sandra Dee

T
Tarzan's Greatest Adventure, directed by John Guillermin, starring Gordon Scott, Anthony Quayle, Sean Connery
Telegrame – (Romania)
Ten Seconds to Hell, directed by Robert Aldrich, starring Jack Palance
Terror Is a Man, starring Francis Lederer – (U.S./Philippines)
That Kind of Woman, directed by Sidney Lumet, starring Sophia Loren and Tab Hunter
The Unknown Woman, directed by Mahmoud Zulfikar, starring Shadia, Shoukry Sarhan and Kamal El-Shennawi – (Egypt)
There Will Be No Leave Today (Segodnya uvolneniya ne budet), directed by Andrei Tarkovsky – (USSR)
These Thousand Hills, starring Richard Egan, Don Murray, Lee Remick
They Came to Cordura, starring Gary Cooper, Rita Hayworth, Van Heflin, Richard Conte, Dick York, Tab Hunter
Third Man on the Mountain, starring Michael Rennie
Tiger Bay, starring John Mills and Hayley Mills – (Britain)
The Tiger of Eschnapur, directed by Fritz Lang – (West Germany)
The Tingler, starring Vincent Price
Tommy the Toreador, starring Tommy Steele – (Britain)
Too Many Crooks, starring Terry-Thomas and George Cole – (Britain)
Train Without a Timetable (Vlak bez voznog reda) – (Yugoslavia)
The Trap, starring Richard Widmark, Lee J. Cobb, Earl Holliman, Tina Louise
Two Men in Manhattan (Deux hommes dans Manhattan), directed by Jean-Pierre Melville – (France)

U
Up Periscope, starring James Garner and Edmond O'Brien

V
Il vedovo (The Widower), directed by Dino Risi, starring Alberto Sordi – (Italy)
La vida alrededor (Life Around Us) – (Spain)
Violent Summer (Estate violenta), starring Jean-Louis Trintignant – (Italy/France)

W
Warlock, directed by Edward Dmytryk, starring Henry Fonda, Richard Widmark and Anthony Quinn
The Wasp Woman, starring Susan Cabot
We Are Altogether Crazy (Vi er allesammen tossede) – (Denmark)
Westbound, starring Randolph Scott and Virginia Mayo
When the Woman Butts In (Kam čert nemůže) – (Czechoslovakia)
The Wild and the Innocent, starring Audie Murphy, Joanne Dru, Sandra Dee
Woman Obsessed, starring Susan Hayward
The Wonderful Country, starring Robert Mitchum and Julie London
The World, the Flesh and the Devil, starring Harry Belafonte and Inger Stevens
The World of Apu (Apur Sansar), directed by Satyajit Ray – (India)
The Wreck of the Mary Deare, starring Gary Cooper and Charlton Heston – (Britain/U.S.)

Y
Yellowstone Kelly, starring Clint Walker and Edd Byrnes
Yesterday's Enemy, directed by Val Guest, starring Stanley Baker – (Britain)
The Young Philadelphians, starring Paul Newman, Barbara Rush, Brian Keith, Alexis Smith, Robert Vaughn

Z
Zorro, the Avenger, feature film released outside of the U.S., compiled from six episodes of the Disney Zorro, the Avenger TV series, starring Guy Williams and Charles Korvin

Short film series
Looney Tunes (1930–1969)
Terrytoons (1930–1964)
Merrie Melodies (1931–1969)
Bugs Bunny (1940–1962)
Yosemite Sam (1945–1963)
Speedy Gonzales (1953–1968)
The Three Stooges (1934–1959)
Loopy De Loop (1959–1965)

Births 
January 1 - Adrian Hall (actor), English former actor and co-director
January 4 - Vanity (singer), Canadian singer, songwriter, model and actress (died 2016)
January 5 – Clancy Brown, American actor and voice actor
January 12 - Ralf Moeller, German actor
January 13 - Alan Taylor (director), American director
January 17 – Momoe Yamaguchi, Japanese former actress and singer
January 22 – Linda Blair, American actress
January 26 - Herbert Sigüenza, American actor, writer, visual artist and performer
January 27 - Glenn Taranto, American actor and writer
January 28 - Frank Darabont, American director, screenwriter and producer
January 30 - Alex Hyde-White, American actor
January 31 - Anthony LaPaglia, Australian actor
February 1 - Slink Johnson, American rapper, actor and comedian
February 2 – Laine Mägi, Estonian actress and dancer
February 4 – Pamelyn Ferdin, American actress
February 8 - Henry Czerny, Canadian actor
February 12 - Sigrid Thornton, Australian actress
February 18 - Jayne Atkinson, British-American actress
February 22 – Kyle MacLachlan, American actor
March 3
Taylor Nichols, American actor
Olivier Rabourdin, French actor
March 5 – Darío Grandinetti, Argentinian actor
March 6 – Tom Arnold, American actor and comedian
March 7
Donna Murphy, American actress and singer
Nick Searcy, American character actor
March 8 – Aidan Quinn, Irish-American actor
March 11 – Margus Oopkaup, Estonian actor and dramatist 
March 12 - Luenell, American comedian and actress
March 14
Laila Robins, American actress
Tamara Tunie, American actress, director and producer
March 15 – Renny Harlin, Finnish director and producer
March 16
Gary Basaraba, Canadian actor
Ludger Pistor, German actor
March 18
Luc Besson, French director and producer
Irene Cara, American actress and singer (died 2022)
March 22 – Matthew Modine, American actor
March 23 – Catherine Keener, American actress
March 27 - Brian Tarantina, American character actor (died 2019)
April 1 - Ivan G'Vera, Czech actor
April 3 – David Hyde Pierce, American actor
April 4 - Phil Morris, American actor and voice actor
April 13 - Jodie Markell, American actress and director
April 15
Emma Thompson, English actress
Thomas F. Wilson, American actor, comedian and musician
April 17 – Sean Bean, English actor
April 20
Clint Howard, American actor
Yuji Okumoto, American actor of Japanese descent
April 23 - Tim Blaney, American puppeteer and voice actor
April 24 - Glenn Morshower, American character actor
April 27 - Neil Pearson, British actor
May 3 - Ben Elton, English comedian, actor and director
May 10 - Victoria Rowell, American actress
May 12 - Ving Rhames, American actor
May 15 - Chris Meledandri, American producer and founder and CEO of Illumination (company)
May 16 – Mare Winningham, American actress
May 19 - Jim Ward, American voice actor, radio personality and camera operator
May 20 - Bronson Pinchot, American actor
May 21
Nick Cassavetes, American actor, director and writer
Dana Kimmell, American former actress and model
May 26 - Kevin Gage (actor), American character actor
May 29 – Rupert Everett, English actor
June 6
Neal H. Moritz, American producer
Colin Quinn, American stand-up comedian, actor and writer
June 7 - Francis Magee, Irish actor
June 11 – Hugh Laurie, English actor
June 22 – Wayne Federman, American actor and comedian
June 23 - Duane Whitaker, American character actor'
June 29 - Charlotte Attenborough, British actress
June 30 – Vincent D'Onofrio, American actor
July 2 - Jere Fields, American former actress
July 3 
Andreas Wisniewski, German actor and former dancer
Elisa Gabrielli, American actress and voice actress
July 8 - Robert Knepper, American actor
July 9 - Kevin Nash, American actor and retired professional wrestler
July 12 - Charlie Murphy, American actor, comedian and writer (died 2017)
July 16 - Bob Joles, American voice actor and musician
July 26 – Kevin Spacey, American actor
July 29 – Sanjay Dutt, Indian actor
August 2 - Jim Doughan, American actor and writer
August 3 - John C. McGinley, American actor
August 10 – Rosanna Arquette, American actress
August 14 – Marcia Gay Harden, American actress
August 22 - Mark Williams (actor), English actor, presenter and screenwriter
August 27 - Peter Mensah, Ghanaian-British actor
August 28 - Brian Thompson, American actor
August 29 – Rebecca De Mornay, American actress
September 10
Michael Earl (puppeteer), American puppeteer, actor, writer and singer (died 2015)
Peter Nelson (actor), American actor, producer and writer
September 14 – Haviland Morris, American actress
September 23
Jason Alexander, American actor
Elizabeth Pena, American actress, writer, panelist and musician (died 2014)
September 24 - Steve Whitmire, American puppeteer
October 2 - Kevin Eldon, English actor and comedian
October 3 – Greg Proops, American actor, stand-up comedian, voice artist and television host
October 9 - Dylan Baker, American character actor
October 10 
Julia Sweeney, American actress, comedian and author
Bradley Whitford, American actor and producer
October 17 - Norm Macdonald, Canadian stand-up comedian, writer and actor (died 2021)
October 21
Tony Ganios, American actor
Melora Walters, American actress
Ken Watanabe, Japanese actor
October 22 - Marc Lawrence (filmmaker), American director, screenwriter and producer
October 23
Sam Raimi, American filmmaker and producer
Weird Al Yankovic, American singer, songwriter, musician, record producer, satirist, actor, music video director, and author 
October 26 - François Chau, American actor
October 31 - Michael DeLorenzo, American actor, director, writer, producer and musician
November 2 - Peter Mullan, Scottish actor and filmmaker
November 4 - Ken Kirzinger, Canadian actor and stuntman
November 8 - Don McManus, American character actor
November 10 - Mackenzie Phillips, American actress and singer
November 14 – Paul McGann, English actor
November 19 – Allison Janney, American actress
November 20 – Sean Young, American actress
November 28 – Judd Nelson, American actor
December 13 – Johnny Whitaker, American actor
December 14 - Debbie Lee Carrington, American actress and stuntwoman (died 2018)
December 29 – Patricia Clarkson, American actress
December 30 - Tracey Ullman, British-American actress, comedian, singer, writer, producer and director
December 31 – Val Kilmer, American actor

Deaths
January 21
 Cecil B. DeMille, 77, American director and producer, The Ten Commandments, The Greatest Show on Earth
 Carl Switzer, 31, American singer and actor, Our Gang
February 1 – Madame Sul-Te-Wan, 85, American actress, King of the Zombies, In Old Chicago
February 4 – Una O'Connor, 78, Irish actress, Witness for the Prosecution, The Adventures of Robin Hood
February 5 – Gwili Andre, 51, Danish actress, Secrets of the French Police, No Other Woman
February 20 – George Archainbaud, 68, French director, Thirteen Women, Girls of the Big House
February 22 – Helen Parrish, 34, American actress, Too Many Blondes, X Marks the Spot
March 2 – Eric Blore, 71, British actor, Top Hat, The Lady Eve, The Adventures of Ichabod and Mr. Toad
March 3 – Lou Costello, 52, American comedian and actor, half of Abbott and Costello comedy team, Africa Screams, Abbott and Costello Meet Frankenstein
March 26 – Raymond Chandler, 70, American author and screenwriter, The Big Sleep, Double Indemnity
March 27 – Grant Withers, 54, American actor, My Darling Clementine, Fort Apache
April 12 – James Gleason, 76, American actor, Here Comes Mr. Jordan, The Bishop's Wife
April 17 – Cecil Cunningham, 70, American actress, The Awful Truth, Monkey Business
April 18 – Irving Cummings, 70, American director, Louisiana Purchase, The Dolly Sisters
May 3 – Troy Sanders, 57, American score arranger and composer, White Christmas, Going My Way
June 2 – Lyda Borelli, 75, Italian actress, Malombra, The Moth
June 4 – Charles Vidor, 58, Hungarian director, Gilda, Love Me or Leave Me
June 16 – George Reeves, 45, American actor, Gone with the Wind, So Proudly We Hail!
June 18 – Ethel Barrymore, 79, American actress, Portrait of Jennie, The Spiral Staircase
August 6 – Preston Sturges, 60, American writer, director, Sullivan's Travels, The Lady Eve
September 6 
 Edmund Gwenn, 81, British actor, Miracle on 34th Street, Mister 880
 Kay Kendall, 32, British actress, Genevieve, Les Girls
September 11 – Paul Douglas, 52, American actor, A Letter to Three Wives, It Happens Every Spring
September 13 – Adrian, 56, American costume designer, The Wizard of Oz, The Women
September 14 – Wayne Morris, 45, American actor, Kid Galahad, Paths of Glory
September 25 – Helen Broderick, 68, American actress, Top Hat, Swing Time
September 30 – Taylor Holmes, 81, American actor, Kiss of Death, Sleeping Beauty
October 3 – William Bishop, 41, American actor, Harriet Craig, Top Gun
October 7 – Mario Lanza, 38, American singer and actor, The Great Caruso, Winged Victory
October 12 – Edward Keane, 75, American actor, Frontier Pony Express, The Roaring Twenties
October 14 – Errol Flynn, 50, Australian actor, The Adventures of Robin Hood, Captain Blood
October 21 – Olive Blakeney, 60, American actress, Leave It to Blanche, Don't Get Me Wrong
October 23 – Gerda Lundequist, 88, Swedish actress, Gosta Berlings Saga
October 30 – Noel Francis, 53, American actress, Blonde Crazy, I Am a Fugitive from a Chain Gang
November 7 – Victor McLaglen, 72, British actor, The Quiet Man, Gunga Din
November 20 – Sylvia Lopez, 26, French actress, Hercules Unchained, Son of the Red Corsair
November 21 – Max Baer, 50, American boxer and actor, The Prizefighter and the Lady, The Harder They Fall
November 25 – Gérard Philipe, 36, French actor, Fan-Fan the Tulip, Beauties of the Night
December 1 – Jose Nepomuceno, 66, Filipino filmmaker and producer, Country Maiden, The Three Humbugs
December 22 – Gilda Gray, 58, American actress, Aloma of the South Seas, Cabaret
December 24 – Edmund Goulding, 68, American director, Grand Hotel, The Razor's Edge

Film debuts
Jack Betts – The Bloody Brood
Terry Burnham – Imitation of Life 
Seymour Cassel – Shadows
James Coburn – Ride Lonesome
David Doyle – Happy Anniversary
Mia Farrow – John Paul Jones
Don Francks – Ivy League killers (The Fast Ones)
Jerry Goldsmith (film composer) – Face of a Fugitive
George Hamilton – Crime and Punishment U.S.A.
Richard Harris – Shake Hands with the Devil
Shirley Knight – Five Gates to Hell
Martin Landau – Pork Chop Hill
Millie Perkins – The Diary of Anne Frank
Michael J. Pollard – It Happened to Jane
Carl Reiner – Happy Anniversary
Bert Remsen – Pork Chop Hill
Jason Robards – The Journey
Martin Scorsese – Vesuvius VI
George C. Scott – The Hanging Tree
Steven Spielberg – The Last Gunfight
Stella Stevens – Say One for Me
Billy Dee Williams – The Last Angry Man
Clarence Williams III – Pork Chop Hill

References

 
Film by year